Verreries-de-Moussans is a commune in the Hérault department in the Occitanie region in southern France.

Geography
The Thoré flows northwest through the commune and forms part of its northwestern border.

Population

See also
Communes of the Hérault department

References

Communes of Hérault